Kim Gu (29 August 1876 – 26 June 1949), also known by his pen name Baekbeom (백범), was a prominent Korean statesman, educator, and independence activist. He was a leader of the Korean independence movement against the Empire of Japan, head of the Provisional Government of the Republic of Korea for multiple terms, and a Korean reunification activist after 1945. Kim is revered in the Republic of Korea, where he is widely considered one of the greatest figures in Korean history.

Kim was born into an impoverished farming family in the chaotic last few decades of the Joseon kingdom. In its last century, Joseon experienced several peasant rebellions and encroachment from multiple global powers, including the Empire of Japan, the Russian Empire, Qing China, and the United States. Kim fought for Korean independence for most of his life, and was jailed, tortured, and even permanently disfigured by Japanese authorities for his activities. He both planned and was the target of numerous assassination attempts, and was the mastermind behind an assassination attempt that almost killed Japanese Emperor Hirohito. He spent 26 years in exile in China, serving various roles in the Provisional Government and collaborating with the Republic of China. After the 1945 surrender of Japan in World War II, Kim and fellow members of that government returned and became key figures in the liberated Korea. There, Kim tried to prevent Korea from fracturing into two.

However, in 1949, just four years after his return and just before the outbreak of the 1950 Korean War, Kim was assassinated by Korean Lieutenant Ahn Doo-hee.

While Kim is mostly celebrated in modern South Korea, he is not without his share of critics. In 1896, Kim murdered a Japanese man who he believed may have been connected to the Japanese military or even involved in the recent assassination of Empress Myeongseong. The man is generally agreed to be Tsuchida Josuke, a civilian merchant on a business trip. He was also involved in coordinating attacks against Japanese military and colonial government personnel. His legacy is somewhat less enthusiastically celebrated in North Korea, due to his anti-Communist views, although he softened these in order to reconcile with Kim Il-sung near the end of his life. However, in the South, these efforts at appeasing Kim Il-sung were criticized by contemporary and modern scholars.

Early life
Kim was born Kim Chang-ahm on 29 August 1876 in Teot-gol, Baekunbang, Haeju City, Hwanghae Province, Joseon. His birth place is now in modern North Korea. He was the only son of father Kim Soon-young and mother Kwak Nak-won. His parents were both farmers. 

Kim had a difficult childhood. His family was impoverished, poorly educated, and looked down upon by the community. He and his father were even beaten on multiple occasions by the local elite. They belonged to the once noble yangban Andong Kim clan. However, the clan lost its noble status around 300 years prior, as Kim Ja-jeom fell from grace. Ja-jeom's direct descendants became slaves, and the rest of the Andong clan became commoners.

At age two, Kim suffered from smallpox, leaving him with scars on his face.

In order to escape poverty, at nine years old, he began studying at local seodangs in preparation for the Gwageo, the demanding civil service examinations that determined placement in government intellectual jobs. His education covered various Chinese classic texts including the Zizhi Tongjian and Great Learning. His mother made a point of paying for his education by earning money through weaving.

In 1888, the father of 12-year-old Kim suffered a stroke that left him paralyzed. His family moved from place-to-place, searching for a doctor while begging for food. Kim's father eventually somewhat recovered, and was able to walk on his own, albeit with difficulty.  

In 1892, at the age of 16, Kim took the Gwageo but failed. He reportedly witnessed and was frustrated by the elite candidates engaging in cheating and bribes. He quit studying at the Seodang and spent three months studying philosophical and military texts on his own and reflecting on his life.

Activities before Japanese Occupation of Korea (1893–1905)

Role in the Donghak Revolution (1893–1894) 

In January 1893, Kim joined the Donghak movement after traveling to meet its leader, Oh Eung-seon in Podong. The movement was created in 1860 in reaction to the instability of Joseon in the 19th century and the spread of foreign influence and religion in Korea. It sought to rejuvenate the country by revising Confucian practices, introducing democracy, establishing human rights, and eliminating foreign interference. Within a year, Kim became a well-known figure amongst hundreds of people in the movement.

During this time, he changed his name to Kim Changsoo, following the then common East Asian practice of changing names after significant life events.

In early 1894, the peasant revolution began. 17-year-old Kim was appointed a district leader of Palbong City and given a Donghak army regiment of around 700. In the fall, by order of Donghak leader Choi Si-hyung (최시형; 崔時亨), Kim's troops stormed the Haeju fort in Hwanghae province, but the unit was eventually defeated by government and Japanese forces.

A power struggle then occurred, in which Lee Dong-yeop, a fellow rebel, wished to take control of Kim's unit. In December of that year, Lee's unit attacked Kim's and won. Kim managed to escape to the mountainous Monggeumpo. In the meantime, Lee captured and executed Kim's close subordinate Lee Jong-seon. Eventually, Kim buried Lee Jong-seon and decided to defect.

Defection and journey to Qing (1895–1896) 

In 1895, Kim defected and joined Royal Army General Ahn Tae-hun (안태훈; 安泰勳). He spent three months in hiding, while recovering from measles and a high fever. Ahn took such a liking to Kim, that he even allowed Kim's parents to join him in the mountains, and scolded any officials that treated Kim poorly.

Whilst in hiding, Kim met and became influenced by Go Neung-seon, a scholar who followed an isolationist Neo-Confucian ideology called Uijeongcheoksa. Go convinced Kim that Joseon was in great danger from Japanese imperialism, and that he should go visit Qing to convince them to help protect Joseon. This trip was doomed to fail, however, as the Qing dynasty was soon to be defeated by the Japanese in the Sino-Japanese War.

Thus, at age 20, Kim and a companion around eight to nine years his elder named Kim Hyeong-jin decided to first make a pilgrimage to the legendary ancestral home of Koreans, Paekdu Mountain, then through Manchuria, and finally to the Qing capital Beijing. However, near the foot of the mountain, they decided the journey would be too perilous, and instead decided to go directly to Tonghua in Manchuria.

On the way to Tonghua, near the Yalu River, which currently serves as the border between China and North Korea, the two men joined the army of Qing dynasty general Kim Yi-yeon, who was in the midst of attacking Kanggye fortress. However, the attack failed, and Kim escaped.

Killing of Tsuchida Josuke (1896) 
In February 1896, upon hearing of the internal strife in Qing, Kim decided to give up on his trip and return home. He tried to take a boat from Chihapo, Hwanghae Province to Jinnampo, but ice in the river made traveling difficult, so he stayed in Chihapo at an inn.

There, Kim met a man also on his way to Jinnampo. The man wore the Korean hanbok, said his surname was Jeong, and that he lived in Jangyeon, Joseon. However, the man spoke with a Seoul accent and Kim alleges he saw a hidden sword underneath a scroll in his room.

In his autobiography, Baekbeomilji, Kim described his motivation at the time as follows:

The next morning, while the man was eating breakfast, Kim stabbed the man and killed him. Although there is still some debate as to the man's identity, the general consensus is that the man was Tsuchida Josuke (土田 譲亮), a Japanese trader from Tsushima Island, Nagasaki on a business trip. According to one account, when Kim retold the story in August 1935 to some students, Kim said he drank Tsuchida's blood as well.

Kim wrote a confession where he explained his actions and posted it on the wall outside. He was not arrested immediately. He took the money Tsuchida had on his person, amounting to around 800 jeon, gave some to the owner of the boat he would take and the rest to the inn owner to distribute amongst the townspeople. He then returned home by boat.

First imprisonment (1896–1898) 
Three months later, around May of 1896, Kim was arrested in his home. He was first held at a jail in Haeju, where he endured torture and poor treatment, and was then moved to Incheon. 

In Incheon, the constable and superintendent of the prison asked Kim why he killed Tsuchida. Upon hearing his answer, they were sympathetic and treated him with respect. Influential Koreans at the time, including major merchants of Incheon, repeatedly petitioned Korean Justice Department officials to pardon him and collected money for his ransom. 

Through processes that he didn't fully understand at the time, Kim narrowly avoided an execution. On 12 September 1896, the Japanese consular agent Hagiwara Shuichi found Kim guilty of the crime of manslaughter, and recommended execution by beheading. On 2 October 1896, the superintendent, under pressure from the consulate, suggested by telegram to the Incheon court that Kim be executed promptly. The court responded by saying they should ask King Gojong's permission. On 22 October 1896, the King read the motivation behind Kim's actions, and did not approve the sentences of Kim and 10 others. Thus, Kim escaped death.    

In prison, Kim read newly-published textbooks from China about Western history and science such as Taeseo Shinsa (태서신사; 泰西新史) and Saegye Jiji (세계지지; 世界地誌). He was deeply impressed by what he read, and reportedly then abandoned the idea that Westerners were barbarians. Despite wanting to learn more about Western ideas, he never learned to read or write English.

He taught many of his fellow prisoners how to read and write. While he first did this in exchange for favors, he began doing it voluntarily. This helped his standing in the prison, as even guards would ask him for help reading and writing. The Korean newspaper Hwangseong Shinbo (황성신보; 皇城新報) reported that Kim Chang Soo had changed the Incheon Prison into a school.

Escape from prison and Buddhist monkhood (1898–1899) 

In March 1898, he and several fellow prisoners successfully broke out of prison. He eventually met a monk with the surname Lee, who guided him to Magoksa, a Buddhist temple in Gongju, Chungcheong Province. As Lee held a high position at the temple, he offered to let Kim join as a monk and to cover Kim's expenses.

Kim shaved his head and became a monk named Wonjong. He was frequently criticized by the monks at the temple for making mistakes while performing chants and chores. As he didn't necessarily believe in Buddhism or enjoy the lifestyle, he decided he wanted to leave.

In spring of 1899, Kim requested to go study at Geumgang Mountain. His request was approved by the head monk, who gave him rations of grain for his journey. Instead of going to the mountain, Kim slipped away from his fellow monks and reunited with his parents. By May, they made their way to Daebo mountain near Pyeongyang.

Around September or October, the family returned home, where their extended family was still engaged in agriculture. An uncle offered to help Kim settle down with agricultural work and find a bride. Kim declined his offer.

Activities before Korean independence movement (1900–1905) 
He converted to Protestant Christianity in February 1903. In December 1904, he married Choi Jun-rye from Sinchon, Hwanghae Province. He was previously briefly engaged to two women, including Choi Yeo-ok, who passed away from illness in 1903, and Ahn Shin-ho, whom he broke the engagement off with in 1903. The couple had a daughter together in 1906, but she passed away within a year.

He worked as a farmer and started and became principal of several schools. He himself taught various subjects and at various levels, including middle school math. He moved several times for his work during this period.

Independence activities in occupied Korea (1905–1919) 

In November 1905, the short-lived Korean Empire became a protectorate of Japan, after it was compelled to sign the Japan-Korea Treaty of 1905 (also known as the Eulsa Treaty). The treaty was the result of Japanese victory in the 1904–1905 Russo-Japanese War, the 1905 Taft-Katsura agreement between Japan and the United States, and the 1894–1895 First Sino-Japanese War. The combination of these factors effectively cemented Japan's status as the main great power in the region. In a few years, in 1910, Korea would be formally annexed into the Japanese Empire.

Shortly after the November 1905 treaty, Kim went to Seoul to participate in protests against the treaty. He and other future leaders of the Korean independence movement such as Yi Dong-nyeong and Yi Tjoune gave speeches at the Daehan gates of the royal Deoksu palace. They urged Emperor Gwangmu (formerly "King Gojong") to withdraw from the treaty. However, these protests were dispersed by the Korean authorities. Disheartened, Kim decided that Korea would continue to be stuck in a weak position until its people became smarter and more patriotic. He resolved to commit himself more fully to his educational activities. He returned home and continued teaching.

In 1908, Kim joined the New People's Association and became the leader of its Hwanghae branch. The organization was founded in 1906 by Ahn Changho in Los Angeles, California, and was dedicated to the independence of Korea. The group emphasized education, industrialization, and patriotism as tools to achieve its goal. While the group dissolved in 1911, many of its ideals and members were inherited by the Provisional Government in 1919.

Second Imprisonment (1911–1915) 
In 1911, An Myung-geun and several companions, including Kim, were among over 700 people arrested by the Japanese colonial government in response to alleged assassination attempts on the Governor-General of Korea Terauchi Masatake. Kim was sentenced to 15 years in prison.  

In 1912, while imprisoned, Kim changed his name to his most famous one: "Kim Gu", and adopted his also-famous pen name of "Baekbeom". He stated in his autobiography that he changed his name to avoid detection in Japanese nationality records, and that he chose Baekbeom, meaning "ordinary person", in the hope that every Korean would fight for independence.

Interrogations included torture and beatings. Kim's left ear became permanently disfigured, and he attempted suicide but failed. His calves were already scarred from his earlier imprisonment after the killing of Tsuchida. Fellow prisoner and member of Sinminhoe Han Pil-ho (한필호; 韓弼昊) was killed, and Shin Suk-choong (신석충; 申錫忠) committed suicide. An tried to commit suicide during the interrogation process but failed.

He spent two years and six months in Seodaemun Prison, which is now a museum, before being transferred to an Incheon prison as prisoner number 55. Here, Kim was reunited with his former cellmate from 17 years ago, Moon Jong-chil.

Release from prison (1915–1919) 
In August 1915, Kim was released on parole, as no evidence linking him to the assassination attempt was found. Kim became involved in sharecropping after his release, and also educated his fellow farmers.

Exile in China before the Sino-Japanese War (1919–1937) 

On 1 March 1919, Kim participated in a nationwide non-violent protest now known as the March 1st Movement that was brutally suppressed by Imperial Japan, resulting in thousands of deaths and tens of thousands of arrests. Kim and many other Korean nationalists soon left the country to escape from Japanese authorities. This movement is widely considered a catalyst for the Korean independence movement, and is now remembered as a national holiday in South Korea.

Early Provisional Government (1919–1926) 
On 29 March 1919, Kim began a train journey to Shanghai, China in order to join the Provisional Government (KPG) of the Republic of Korea. Kim's wife, son, and mother eventually joined him in Shanghai in the early 1920s. He arrived around mid-April, and quickly joined the National Legislature. In September 1919, the first president of the KPG, Syngman Rhee, was elected, and Kim made the Chief of Staff.

The KPG was highly unstable for much of its history. Numerous positions and offices were created then dissolved within a few years. Kim and many others often served in one or more positions for just a few months until moving onto a new one. For example, in April 1924, Kim moved on from his position of acting Prime Minister to concurrently serving as Minister of Internal Affairs and as Minister of Labor. The government and its members also struggled with funding. In order to avoid detection by the Japanese authorities, the government moved often, renting buildings in the French concession, the British concession, and from the Kuomintang. They struggled to pay rent and salaries, which was a source of constant friction and fracturing inside of the group. On 29 August 1925, Na Seokju sold his clothes in order to buy a birthday gift for Kim's 49th birthday. Kim remembered that he himself was unable to afford celebrating his mother's 60th birthday (Korean age) in 1919, and was so ashamed that he decided to no longer celebrate his own birthday.

Kim's family life was difficult during this period. In January 1924, just two years after the birth of his second son, Shin, his wife Jun-rye passed away at around age 34. Because Kim was a wanted man, he was unable to visit her in the hospital before she died. In November 1925, his mother and Shin returned to Korea to avoid interfering in Kim's work. Eventually, in September 1927, his eldest son In would also return to Korea.

First term as president and government instability (1926–1930) 
The group also suffered from internal conflict. In March 1925, Syngman Rhee was impeached over allegations that he abused his power. From then until December 1926, leadership changed rapidly, as seven heads of state served and resigned. Most only served a few months, with Ahn Changho serving fewer than two weeks due to being unable to form a cabinet. Rhee left to the United States shortly after his impeachment. In 1928, Kim sent letters to him, asking for donations to the KPG, which Rhee refused on the grounds that he too was suffering from financial difficulties. 
 

From 14 December 1926 to 18 August 1927, Kim Gu served as head of government. In late March 1927, shortly after beginning his term, he reorganized the office of president into "Chairman of the State Council Directory", where the Chairman is the first among equals in a state council. Kim's term was also short; he served around eight months before leaving office. He became the Minister of Internal Affairs again after leaving office, and Yi Dong-nyeong became the head of government. Yi served for two three year terms, until 1933; the first President since 1925 to serve for longer than a year. 

In 1930, Kim established and became the head of the Korea Independence Party, in an effort to unite the conservative members of the government. The party would last until 1970, albeit as a minor party after his death in 1949. 

In May 1929, he completed the first volume of the Baekbomilji, when he was around 53 years old. Around this time, he handmade and gifted unique copies of the volume as thanks to several donors, including the Korean-American community and Ho Chong.

Korean Patriotic Organization activities (1931–1932) 

In 1931, Kim became the first leader of the Korean Patriotic Organization, which was dedicated to the assassination of important Japanese imperial and colonial personnel.
The organization was created in response to recent events and the perceived stagnation of the independence movement. For recent events, KPG member Kim Jwa-jin was assassinated by an agent of Japan in 1930. By 1932, Japan had caused the Mukden incident, invaded Manchuria, and caused tensions in Shanghai in the January 28 incident. The KPG also wanted to improve the relationship between China and Korea, due to heightened tensions between the two after the 1931 Wanpaoshan incident. The Organization's cause was seen as so urgent that it received around half of the budget of the KPG.

On 8 January 1932, Organization member Lee Bong-chang nearly assassinated the Emperor of Japan Hirohito in Tokyo, in what became known as the Sakuradamon incident. Kim planned and funded this operation. Lee threw a grenade that missed the Emperor's carriage and killed only two horses. He was later executed on 10 October.

On 29 April 1932, member Yun Bong-gil planted a bomb that killed and wounded several Japanese military leadership in Hongkou Park (now Lu Xun Park) in Shanghai, including the commander of the Japanese Army and Navy. After a botched suicide attempt at the scene of the crime, he was captured and later executed on 19 December.

In April 1932, members Yoo Jin-shik and Lee Deok-ju were sent to Korea to assassinate Japanese Governor-General of Korea Kazushige Ugaki. If Yun had not been captured, he would have been on this mission. However, the mission failed; Yoo was arrested around 24 April – 28 April, and Lee was arrested afterwards in Haeju.

On 26 May 1932, the organization failed another mission. The targets were Kwantung Army general Honjō Shigeru, Japanese Foreign Minister and President of the South Manchuria Railway company Uchida Kōsai, and Kwantung Governor Mannosuke Yamaoka. Kim dispatched members Choi Heung-sik in late March and Yoo Sang-geun on 27 April to Dalian, in Manchuria. The targets were going to appear at Dalian station on 26 May at 7:40pm, for a meeting with delegates from the League of Nations. Kim dispatched Choi a month earlier than Yoo, in order to have him scope out the area before the attack. Yoo, carrying weapons and a canteen bomb, similar to a bomb used by Yun at Hongkou Park, arrived at Dalian on 4 May. However, a telegram they had sent at the Dalian post office days prior was intercepted by the Japanese. Choi was found in his hideout, tortured for the whereabouts of Yoo, and executed. Yoo was caught on 25 May, sentenced to life imprisonment, and passed away on 14 August 1945, a day before the liberation of Korea.

After these incidents, the Organization largely stopped its activities. While the missions had mixed success, they did help improve Chinese and Korean ties and the financial standing of the KPG. A few months after, the Kuomintang began covering Kim's living and work expenses, and allowing some Koreans to enroll in its military academy. A monument to Yun also now stands in Lu Xun Park.

Infamy, escape from Shanghai, and life on the run (1932–1933) 
After the Shanghai bombings in late April, Kim became infamous. His role in planning the attacks were published by newspapers in Shanghai. Various Japanese government bodies put bounties on him worth a combined 60,000 Dayang, an enormous sum for that time.

He and several other Organization members spent around 20 days in hiding at the house of American Presbyterian missionary George Ashmore Fitch in Shanghai. When the Japanese came close to finding him, Kim escaped by pretending to be an American couple with Fitch's wife. A Chinese sympathizer named Chu Fucheng helped Kim and others escape to a hiding place at 76 Meiwan Street in Jiaxing. The building had numerous features to facilitate hiding, including false closets, hidden doors, and a boat docked underneath the house. It still exists to this day, with a memorial at the spot.

Around June 1932, Kim resigned from the KPG, acknowledging he wouldn't be able to adequately perform his duties while on the run.

In the summer, after witnessing Japanese authorities at Jiaxing station questioning locals on Kim's whereabouts, Chu moved Kim to his daughter-in-law Zhu Jiarui's house at Zaiqing Villa in Haiyan county. Here too now stands a memorial of Kim's time there.

'Marriage' to Zhu Aibao (1932) 

In order to make up for Kim's poor Chinese-speaking skills, Zhu proposed that he marry a local Chinese woman. She suggested he marry one of her friends, a middle school teacher. However, Kim thought a teacher would be too intelligent and might figure him out, and instead proposed marrying the 20-year-old owner of the boat he often rode, named Zhu Aibao. They had a 37-year age gap. While they never officially married, they were functionally husband and wife, and began to live together on her boat.

Ironically, being on the run in Haiyan was one of the most peaceful times of his life after his exile. Although he still participated in independence-related activities, he enjoyed the time outside of work. When he lived in Shanghai, he had rarely spent time outdoors. Here, he embarked on regular hiking trips and spent time with Zhu. He even came to view her as his actual spouse. In his autobiography, he wrote that he felt bad about deceiving her and not being of much financial help. They had a relationship for around five years total. It remains unclear whether Zhu ever knew about Kim's true identity. After November 1937, he never saw her again. Later, Kim's descendants attempted to locate Zhu Aibao or her descendants, but were unable to.

Three assassinations and an attempted fourth (1933) 
In the second half of 1933, three successful assassinations and an attempted fourth occurred that were all connected to Kim.  

First, in July 1933, Kim found out that his former KPG colleague Ok Kwan-bin had turned into a cooperator with the Japanese government and was publicly slandering members of the independence movement. Ok allegedly also became quite wealthy and prominent in Shanghai society, employing hundreds at a pharmaceutical company, acquiring newspaper companies, buying luxury cars, and making deals with Japanese colonial institutions. The betrayal and perceived flaunting of wealth infuriated Kim and several others, and they agreed to assassinate him.

Kim enlisted the help of a group of anarchists in Shanghai called the South China Korean Youth Alliance. Independently of the KPG, they previously had engaged in various attacks on the Japanese military in Shanghai. Kim had the money but lacked reliable manpower. So he enlisted their help, and funded them to track and subsequently assassinate Ok.

On 1st August 1933, at 9pm, the assassination was carried out. The group had tracked Ok's movements for two months and found that he was having an affair with a woman who lived in the French Concession. The assassins were Oh Myeon-jik and Eom Hyeong-soon. When Ok left the house of his mistress, Eom pulled up in his car and fired three shots at Ok, killing him on the spot. One week after, Kim Gu sent a press release to various newspapers in Shanghai, announcing the killing and the motivations behind it.

Second, on 17 August, a pro-Japanese Korean officer named Lee Jin-ryong, who was investigating Kim, was shot by members of the Shanghai Korean Community, which Kim was a member of (at latest) since 1923.

Next came the assassination attempt. The Chinese and Korean community were shocked by the attacks. Many sympathizers panicked, thinking they'd be next. Yoo In-bal, the leader of the Shanghai Korean Friends Association, decided he wouldn't sit around until they came for him. On 28 August, he went door-to-door in the French Concession with a concealed pistol, asking everyone how they felt about the Association. He eventually met Park Chang-se, a KPG member and Kim ally. They had a friendly conversation long into the night, with Park assuring Yoo he meant no harm. On 31 August, a young assassin rushed into Yoo's home and shot him, but he survived. Later examination of the bullet casings found that they were the same as those used in Lee's assassination. Later, an arrest warrant was issued for Park, but he escaped.

The third assassination was on 18 December. Ok's cousin, also a Japanese sympathizer, had been seeking revenge for his cousin's death. He was then himself shot and killed.

Cooperation with the Kuomintang (1933–1937) 

Around July 1932, Kim had requested a meeting with Chiang Kai-shek and the establishment of a cavalry training school for the numerous Koreans in Manchuria. Chiang agreed to meet Kim, but was skeptical of the viability of the cavalry school.

Around May 1933, they met in Nanjing. According to Kim's autobiography, after exchanging verbal pleasantries, Kim picked up a brush and wrote in Chinese: "If you give me 1,000,000 yuan, within two years I can cause such chaos in Japan, Korea, and Manchuria that it will destroy Japan's 'bridge' to invading the mainland. What do you think of this?"

After some negotiations, they compromised; Chiang agreed to pay Kim 5,000 yuan per month, offered to hide him from the Japanese, and allow him to train Korean resistance fighters in the Luoyang branch of the Republic of China Military Academy. In addition, 40 horses were to be provided in order to train a cavalry unit. Although somewhat disappointed by the lack of a Manchurian school, Kim was elated to have a stable source of revenue. He then spent much effort in trying to recruit young Korean fighters.

Training independence fighters (1934–1935) 
In February 1934, Kim became administrator of 92 students in the 17th Army Officer Training Class of the 4th Battalion, around 30km north of Luoyang. Kim's class was named and presented as if it were yet another all-Chinese class (the previous 16 classes had graduated only Chinese students), in order to avoid detection from the Japanese. Training covered topics such as tactics, weapons, politics, communication, physical education, riding, and shooting. They trained with great urgency, as there was a prevailing sense that a second Sino-Japanese conflict and/or World War would erupt within one to two years.

He had made a special point of recruiting the armed forces of the 1930 Korea Independence Party (different from Kim's party). These fighters had sided with Chinese forces during the Japanese invasion of Manchuria. In addition, also in attendance were 20 students of the Joseon Revolutionary Military and Political Officers School in Nanjing. Kim had not been the first to receive funding and military training support from the Kuomintang. Kim Won-bong, former leader of the Shanghai-based Heroic Corps, had been training students in Nanjing since October 1932. Although Kim Won-bong's leftist leanings clashed with Kim Gu's anti-Communism, both Kims collaborated here after coaxing from the Kuomintang leadership. The two would later become rivals.

The training had several difficulties. Around June, Kim's funding from the Kuomintang was cut in half. In addition, Japanese authorities began to zero in on their Luoyang training location, and so they had to temporarily relocate to a temple. Around August, 25 students, including Kim's son In, were expelled by order of Kim and either placed on special missions or into regular Kuomintang military classes. Around September, four trainees were caught and arrested by Japanese authorities in Nanjing. By October, training activities greatly slowed. In December 1934, he created a special forces division for the remaining trainees, which came to be known as the "Kim Gu Club".

On 9 April 1935, the school stopped after only operating for about a year. Of the original 92 students, 62 graduated. The school was closed for a variety of reasons, including internal conflicts between left and right leaning members and 21 January 1935 negotiations between the Kuomintang and Japanese governments.

Reunification with family (1934) 

After courses began, he invited his mother and sons to return to China. His stable income, protection from the Kuomintang, and the advanced age of his mother (75) motivated this decision. With assistance from independence fighters such as Kim Seon-ryang, they secretly took a boat from Pyongyang to Dalian, another to Shanghai, and finally a train to Jiaxing. In early April 1934, Kim reunited with his mother and two sons in Jiaxing for the first time in nine years. They went together to Nanjing, where Kim had prepared a house for them.

Chaos and fracturing in the Provisional Government (1933–1935) 
As a result of the bombing, the assassinations, the flight of Government members from Shanghai, and the increasingly intense searching of the Japanese, the independence movement was thrown into chaos. Much of the Government stopped functioning, and internal infighting amongst those who stayed in Shanghai intensified.

In January 1933, Kim's Independence Party voted to remove all of the absent leadership, except for Kim. Despite the fact that Kim had resigned from the Government in the previous year, they kept him on out of respect. Regardless, he functionally didn't play much of a role in the party between his escape and 1934. 

The Government moved its headquarters several times during this period. On 3 October 1933, the Provisional Assembly held its first meeting in a year at Hangzhou, delayed due to the chaos and the vacant chairman position. Four people attended. On 2 January 1934, they held another meeting in Zhenjiang. This time, they elected all new members, but Kim was not a candidate. Thus, after almost 15 years of serving in the Assembly, Kim lost his seat.

In mid-1935, a significant split in the Government emerged while Kim was busy with training students. A majority of the Government, including Kim Won-bong, Jo So-ang and Kim Tu-bong, began advocating for the dissolution of the Government and all parties, in favor of creating a single-party government. This came to pass in July, as several parties, including a breakaway group of Kim's party, unified into the Korean National Revolutionary Party (KNRP) under Kim Won-bong's leadership. Kim Gu opposed the dissolution of the KPG and saw one-party rule as infeasible, as internal tensions were only growing and not shrinking. He openly criticized the KNRP in multiple public letters. After two years of absence, he rejoined the Government and united what remained of it into the Korean National Party (KNP) around November. The more right-leaning KNP aligned itself with the United States and the left-leaning KNRP more with the Soviet Union. Even graduates of Kim's military school ended up divided along factional lines, and joined various organizations afterwards. The two parties competed fiercely for the support of the broader Korean community and the Kuomintang, publishing public letters and newspapers to advocate their positions.

Exile in China during the Second Sino-Japanese War (1937–1945) 

In early July 1937, the anticipated conflict between the Chinese and Japanese finally began. On 15 July, the KPG met to plan their involvement in the conflict. They saw it as a critical opportunity to achieve independence. On 9 August, the Government approved a plan to set up a training camp and train an army that included 200 junior officers. Their planned budget for 1938 was 226 times larger than their 1937 budget, with military expenditures accounting for 98% of it. They expected to receive most of their funding from the Kuomintang, and the remaining approximately one-fifth via donations from the international Korean community. However, these efforts were a failure, as none of their plans came to fruition due to their following the retreat of the Kuomintang across China.

Flight from Nanjing to Changsha (1937–1938) 

On 17 August 1937, the various parties finally united into a coalition. The Japanese began air raids on Nanjing, which Kim experienced on 26 August. In early November, Japanese troops began approaching Nanjing. The Kuomintang began moving to Chongqing on 16 November, and the KPG to Changsha on 18 November. They chose Changsha because of its lower cost of living and its proximity to Hong Kong, through which they could contact the outside world. They also decided if the war got even worse, they could relocate to Hawaii. Kim set about coordinating and funding the evacuation of around 120 people, including Government personnel and their families. He lamented only being able to provide just 100 yuan for Zhu Aibao, his 'wife', to return to Jiaxing. They never saw each other again. Kim then took his younger son and mother on a British steam ship to Hankou, then another boat to Changsha.

Just three weeks after their departure, the Japanese perpetrated the infamous Nanjing Massacre, also called the Rape of Nanjing.

By 20 December, the KPG completed moving its personnel to Changsha. Finances became tighter, as receiving aid from the Kuomintang or expatriate community became more difficult, and because the other income streams of KPG members were severed. However, they adjusted by housing multiple families together. Around this time, his mother celebrated her 80th birthday (Korean age). He wanted to throw her a party which his mother refused. Instead, she demanded the money be used to purchase a pistol for the Korean fighters. He obeyed her request.

Shot in Changsha (1938) 
Relationships between various parties improved drastically after their move to Changsha, and many found common ground. On 5 May, Kim proposed a dinner for the cadres of several parties, around 10 people total.

On 7 May, they held the dinner on the second floor of a building at Nanmuting in Changsha. Spirits were high, and the group exchanged jokes. Around 6:20pm, a young man burst in and fired four shots from his pistol. Youths downstairs began rushing up to apprehend the culprit, but he escaped by jumping from the second floor. The first bullet hit Kim, the second Hyun Ik-chul, the third Yoo Dong-yeol, and the fourth Ji Cheong-cheon. Of the four people shot, all recovered, except Hyun, who died that day and was later buried on Yuelu Mountain.

Kim was shot in the left chest and lost consciousness. He was taken to the Xiangya Hospital, but the doctor refused to accept him, saying there was no hope for treatment. Telegrams were urgently sent to others in the independence movement, announcing Kim's death, with some immediately disembarking to Changsha expecting to attend his funeral. But Kim continued breathing, and after three hours the doctor finally relented to seeing him. Kim survived the shooting.

The culprit was 30-year-old Lee Un-hwan (李雲漢). He was known for being brash and uncompromising, and had even been expelled from the KNRP just two months earlier after rumors circulated that he wanted to assassinate various party leaders. His stated motivation was that he was dissatisfied with the direction the KNRP was taking. His exact motives remain unclear, although several accounts speculated that he was taking revenge for being expelled. Six days later, he was arrested by Chinese police at a rural train station dozens of kilometers away and sentenced to death. But he escaped from his imprisonment and was never recaptured.

When Chiang Kai-shek heard of the incident, he sent a telegram to Kim's hospital and requested they take good care of him. When Kim came to, he had no memory of what happened. The doctor told him he was admitted due to being excessively drunk, and that his chest injury came from falling on the table, which Kim believed. It was only until his release a month later that he learned the truth. The bullet remained in his chest for the rest of his life and affected his movement. After his release, he finally told his mother what had happened. She had a muted response, responding "You know God is protecting you. Evil cannot hurt the just. But what's regrettable is that the shooter was Korean; being shot by a Korean and living is worse than being shot by a Japanese and dying."

Activities in Chongqing (1938–1945) 
After Kim's release from the hospital, he spent the rest of the year managing the relocation of around 400 KPG members and family. Changsha became unsafe, as Japanese air raids intensified and refugees poured in. The KPG initially moved to Guangzhou, but after a few months, the Japanese began to encroach yet again. They finally decided to move to Chongqing to be with the Kuomintang leadership, abandoning their plan of staying near Hong Kong. Throughout this time, they were under constant threat of the Japanese, and narrowly escaped capture several times. On 26 October, Kim arrived in Chongqing, ahead of much of the KPG and their family. There, he coordinated travel, sent requests for funding abroad, and coordinated with the Kuomintang.

In early 1939, Kim learned that his mother had contracted pharyngitis while traveling, and that her health was deteriorating. He rushed to her bedside in Chongqing, but she could not be saved. Feeling her end was near, Kwak Nak-won gave her final wish to her son: "Succeed in your independence work. After you do, take the ashes of myself and In's mother and bury them in our homeland." She died at 10:50am on 26 April 1939. She is currently buried in the Daejeon National Cemetery, along with In.

Their time in Chongqing was to be difficult. The population of Chongqing was below 500,000 before the war, but after movement of the Kuomintang moved there, it surged to over 1,000,000. Housing was constantly in short supply, and regular Japanese bombing runs made the situation even worse. Kim frequently had to allocate money from their already stretched budget for constructing or maintaining housing for KPG members and their families. From 1938 to 1945, around 70-80 Koreans died of pneumonia due to poor air quality, high humidity, and poor access to healthcare. Among them was Kim's eldest son In, who would die in 1945. Despite all this, the KPG actually lived relatively comfortably compared to much of the Chinese population of Chongqing, as the majority of Chinese families had even less reliable access to food and shelter.

They moved office buildings four times, after each building was destroyed by Japanese bombings. Their second office building was so severely destroyed on 2 September 1940 that not even a single article of clothing could be salvaged from it. Their third office was damp, dark, and had no plumbing, so they placed a bucket in a corner to urinate in. They would use this office for four years (until January 1945), the longest they used a building since Shanghai. While there, Kim would finish the second volume of his autobiography, the Baekbeomilji.

Failure to unite the independence movement (1939–1940) 
After his arrival in Chongqing, Kim began work on integrating the various parties. Despite arguing against integration four years ago, the war had changed his mind. Another significant motivation for this was to appease the Kuomintang leadership, who were disappointed in the movement's continued infighting, epitomized in the Changsha shooting incident. The Kuomintang had even mediated several integration talks in 1937, which failed.

In particular, Kim sought to unify with Kim Won-bong. Unlike Kim Gu and the KPG, Kim Won-bong and the KNRP had actually succeeded in raising an army. On 10 October 1938, Kim Won-bong had created and became commander-in-chief of the first Korean armed forces in China, the Korean Volunteers Army. The army, with the help of Japanese Communist Kazuo Aoyama, managed to raise 100 soldiers and funding from the Kuomintang. By February 1940, they would have 314 soldiers.

In early 1939, they began negotiating their merger in earnest, but sides had somewhat flipped since 1935; Kim proposed a single party, while the left-leaning groups wanted a multi-party government. After several meetings, on 10 May, the two Kims released a joint statement advocating for a one-party government and listing ten shared ideals for the liberated Korea. The shared ideals included topics such as ending feudalism, gender equality, land redistribution, and creating free compulsory education. On 27 August, their parties participated in the Korean Revolution Movement Unification Seven Group Meeting in the Qijiang District of Chongqing, although the two Kims did not personally attend. Two of the seven parties withdrew from the conference after refusing to unite. The remaining five agreed to unite in principal, but talks broke down over the specifics of the merger. They disagreed on who would command the armed forces and to what extent they should collaborate with the right-leaning Kuomintang. Shortly after the breakdown of the talks, Germany invaded Poland, and World War II began.

After talks broke down, the Kuomintang representative at the meeting evaluated the two Kims as follows:

Kim placed the blame of the collapse in negotiations on the left-leaning parties, which the right-leaning Kuomintang generally agreed with. In a later January 1940 letter to Seo Eun-jeung, he presciently predicted that if right and left failed to find common ground now, the Korean peninsula would be "stained red with blood" in the future.

On 13 March 1940, the sitting KPG President Lee Dong-nyeong died of pneumonia. He died at age 70, and had served around 12 years total as the head of government. Kim became head of government after Lee's death. Kim was crushed, and read an emotional eulogy at Lee's funeral on 17 March. On 1 April, the parties within the KPG unified into the Korean Independence Party, and on 11 May, Kim was elected Chairman of the Executive Committee.

The Kuomintang was continually frustrated with the lack of progress. They decided on 19 January 1940 to take a more active role in mediating unification talks, and pushing for unification even if it meant excluding some left-leaning parties. However, they eventually gave up on unification. On 2 April, the Kuomintang met with the various Korean parties. There, they firmly proposed that the left and right leaning groups coexist, but operate in different territories. The KPG would operate between the Yellow River and the Yangtze River, and the KNRP south of the Yangtze. The proposal was accepted.

Creating the Korean Liberation Army (1939–1941) 

On 11 November 1939, the KPG announced a plan, created by Jo So-ang, to create an army. Like their failed proposal in 1938, it was wildly ambitious, calling for 110,000 party members, 1,200 officers, 100,000 soldiers, and 350,000 guerrillas raised after four years, totaling 541,200 personnel across six countries. It had an astronomical price-tag of 70.18 million yuan. By contrast, the total budget of the KPG in 1939 was 29,123 yuan. Son Sae-il, a journalist, Korean historian, and former politician, described the plan as "wildly removed from reality", and called Jo and the State Council that approved the plan "hopeless utopians". Once Kim took the reins of creating the army, he took a more realist approach.  

On 11 April 1940, Chiang approved Kim's proposal for creating a KPG army, albeit with funding granted only depending on immediate needs. However, a disagreement between the Kuomintang and Kim arose, as Chiang wanted the army to be subordinate to the Kuomintang army, and Kim wanted greater independence in order to establish the army's credibility and legitimacy. The Kuomintang pulled out of the deal, refusing to provide funding. Kim moved forward anyway with creating the army.

On 17 September 1940, the formal establishment of the Korean Liberation Army (KLA) was announced. General Ji Cheong-cheon was to be its commander. They held a grand ceremony at then-luxurious Jialing Hotel, in order to establish the army's credibility and reputation. It was held early in the morning, at 6am, as to avoid Japanese air raids. Over 200 people were in attendance, including foreign ambassadors and Kuomintang officials.

In September 1940, Kim was handily reelected as head of government, and he would hold this post until his return to Korea in 1945. On 8 October, the KPG modified its constitution, with particular intent to reorganize the chief executive to have greater power in order to account for a standing army. Thus, Kim became the Chairperson of the State Affairs Commission. This position was no longer considered first among equals, and instead entailed being commander-in-chief of the army, having veto power, and being able to issue executive orders.

On 12 November, the KLA announced their intent to switch from guerrilla warfare to conventional battle. They also moved their headquarters to Xi'an around this time. There, they began carrying out covert operations, recruiting youths, and publishing Chinese and Korean language newsletters. By 1 January 1941, they created five divisions, with over 100 people in the fifth division alone.

The KLA became a rallying point for the Korean-American community, and donations came in greater volume. The San Francisco-based Sinhan Minbo newspaper regularly and prominently reported on the KLA's activities. However, the establishment of the KLA made little impression on the US government. On 25 February 1941, Kim sent a letter to President Franklin D. Roosevelt asking for the establishment of formal KPG-US ties. This was shortly after Roosevelt's famous Arsenal of Democracy speech that advocated for intervention against the Axis and protection of democratic states. Like with previous KPG letters to the US government, it was ignored. When Roosevelt's son, James Roosevelt, visited Chongqing in July, Kim gave him another letter to forward to his father, which was again ignored.

The Kuomintang put off formally recognizing the KLA for months, much to Kim's dismay. The KLA was growing rapidly, as hundreds of Koreans from all over China flocked to join, but the soldiers were sitting idle and underfunded. Despite continuing to communicate with Kim on other matters, Chiang ignored Kim's requests about the KLA. In February 1941, the Kuomintang even ordered its armed forces to block or restrict KLA activities. However, they began easing up around March, and by 28 May 1941, formally recognized the KLA. But aid was still slow to come. One reason for this delay was Kim Won-bong's interference, as he naturally viewed the KLA as competition, especially because the Volunteers Army was subordinate to the Kuomintang and the KLA was more politically aligned with the Kuomintang. Another reason was that the Kuomintang was unsure of the legality or political implications of recognizing the KLA as the legitimate army of the Korean government. But by July, the Kuomintang abandoned these concerns.

In May 1941, Kim Won-bong's KNRP began joining the KPG, albeit to much conflict. The KNRP believed that unification would increase the overall support and credibility of the Korean independence movement. Later attempts for KNRP members to get elected into the National Council were highly controversial, and resulted in fist fights and nullified elections.When the Pacific War broke out on December 8, 1941, Kim declared war on Japan and Germany and committed the Korean Liberation Army to the Allies. The Korean Liberation Army took part in warfare in China and Southeast Asia. Kim arranged for the Korean Liberation Army to advance to Korea in 1945, but days before the departure of the leading unit, the war had ended.

Return to Korea and reunification efforts (1945–1949) 
Kim returned to the liberated Korea upon the surrender of Japan to the Allies in 1945. He was known as "the Assassin" and reportedly travelled with an entourage of gunmen and concubines.

On 27 December 1945, the United States, the United Kingdom, the Soviet Union, and China agreed to a trusteeship for the newly-liberated Korea. Kim was opposed to the trusteeship and to the 1947 creation of The Joint Soviet-American Commission.

Appeasement of Kim Il-sung (1948) 

In mid-April 1948, Kim went to the North. As the division of the newly-independent country under the trusteeship became obvious, Kim led a team of former independence activists to Pyongyang to hold unification talks with Kim Il-sung, who later became the Premier of North Korea in 1948.While Kim Gu was still anti-Communist, he softened his stance in an effort to appease Kim Il-sung. In addition, many Koreans were then distrustful of the US, and unsure of whether the US would support South Korea in the event of a Northern invasion. In a 1985 interview with the Japanese magazine Sekai, Kim Il-sung claimed that Kim Gu asked him for political asylum in the event that his relationship with the US soured. Kim Il-sung then claimed that Kim Gu got on his knees and begged for forgiveness for his past anti-Communist actions. The truthfulness of the latter claim is doubted by several South Korean scholars.

Many of Kim Gu's contemporaries and modern critics were skeptical of his appeasement efforts. The Kuomintang Minister in Seoul rebuked Kim in a 11 July 1948 conversation, saying "damage has been done [...] by your recent activities in connection with the so-called North and South Korean Leaders' Conference held in Pyongyang".

Kim returned to the South deeply concerned that the North would handily win if it invaded the South.

In 1948, the inaugural National Assembly of South Korea nominated Kim as a candidate for the office of the first president of the Republic. In the election by the National Assembly, Kim was defeated by Rhee Syngman, the first president of the Provisional Government, who had been impeached in 1925 by a vote of 180–16. He lost the election for the vice presidency to Lee Si-yeong (이시영; 李始榮) by a vote of 133–59. Kim did not know about his nomination until after the election. He did not approve the nomination since he considered it a ploy to discredit him. Kim would never have participated in the election, as he fiercely opposed the establishment of separate governments in North and South Korea.

Death 
On 26 June 1949, while reading poetry in his office in the evening, Kim was assassinated by Lieutenant Ahn Doo-hee, who burst in and shot him four times.

Years later, in 1996, Ahn himself was murdered by Park Gi-seo, a bus driver and admirer of Kim Gu. The weapon involved in the murder was a 40cm-long wooden rod, with "Stick of Justice" and "Reunification" written on it. In 2018, 70-year-old Park donated the stick, still faintly stained with the blood of Ahn, to the Colonial History Museum in Seoul.

Motive for assassination 
Ahn stated that he had killed Kim because he saw him as an agent of the Soviet Union.

In 1949, Kim Il Sung claimed that Kim Gu had been "murdered by the Syngman Rhee clique." According to Bruce Cumings's 1981 book, another possible motive for the assassination was Kim Gu's alleged connection to the assassination of Song Jin-woo, a leader of the Korean Democratic Party (KDP), who had chosen to work closely with the American military government.

On April 13, 1992, a confession by Ahn was published by the Korean newspaper Dongah Ilbo. In his confession, Ahn claimed that the assassination had been ordered by Kim Chang-ryong, who served as the head of Rhee's national security. In 2001, declassified documents revealed that Ahn had been working for the U.S Counter-Intelligence Corps, leading to suggestions of American involvement in the assassination. However, some have questioned the evidence for those accusations.

Legacy 

His autobiography, Baekbeomilji ("Journal of Baekbeom", 백범일지) is an important source for study of history of Korean independence movement and has been designated as cultural treasure No. 1245 by the Korean government. A steady bestseller in Korea, the autobiography was first published in 1947 and republished in more than 10 versions in Korea and abroad.

In South Korea, Kim has been consistently regarded as one of the greatest figures in Korean history. In a 2004 online poll, he was voted the greatest leader after Korean independence. In 2005, the Korean National Assembly voted him the most revered figure in Korean history, even above Yi Sun-sin.

In a 2007 national survey, Kim was voted to appear on new Korean banknotes, to be issued in 2009. On November 5, 2007, the Bank of Korea announced the new 100,000 Korean won bill would feature Kim's portrait. However, the new bill has been delayed indefinitely as of February 2023, for fear that issuing the bill would cause inflation.

Awards 
In 1962, Kim was posthumously awarded the Republic of Korea Medal of Order of Merit for National Foundation, the most prestigious civil decoration in the Republic of Korea. On 15 August 1990, North Korea awarded him the National Reunification Prize.

Personal life 
Kim was married to Choi Jun-rye (1889 – 1 January 1924) until she died in Shanghai around age 34. She was buried in the Shanghai French Concession. Kim had five children in total, three daughters and two sons, but only his sons survived past childhood. His first daughter Mi-sang lived from 1906–1907. His second daughter Hwa-gyeong lived from 1910–1915. His third daughter Eun-gyeong from 1916–1917. 

Kim In (12 November 1917 – 29 March 1945) joined his father in exile in Shanghai at age 3, in 1920. After briefly moving back to Korea, he returned in 1934 and served various minor roles in the Provisional Government's army. He died in 1945 of pneumonia in Chengdu, Republic of China. He had one daughter Kim Hyo-ja in 1945, who is currently still living.

Kim Shin (21 September 1922 – 19 May 2016), was a founding member of Republic of Korea Air Force, the Chief of Korean Air Force, member of the National Assembly, and the Minister of Transportation, and later the Director of the Kim Koo Museum and Library. He died aged 93. He had five children, including Kim Yang (김양; 金揚; b. 1953), who worked as Korean Consulate General in Shanghai in 2005 and as the Minister of Patriots and Veteran Affairs of Korea (국가보훈처; 國家報勳處) in 2008.

Selected quote
At the end of his autobiography, Baekbeomilji, Kim said the following, now famous, quote:
 If God asked me what was my wish, I would reply unhesitatingly, "Korean independence."
 If he asked me what was my second wish, I would again answer, "My country's independence."
 If he asked me what was my third wish, I would reply in an even louder voice, "My wish is the complete independence of my country, Korea."
 My fellow brethren. This is my only wish. I have lived seventy years of my life for this wish, am living my life for this wish, and will live my life only to fulfill this wish.
[...]
... I want our nation to be the most beautiful in the world. By this I do not mean the most powerful nation. Because I have felt the pain of being invaded by another nation, I do not want my nation to invade others. It is sufficient that our wealth makes our lives abundant; it is sufficient that our strength is able to prevent foreign invasions. The only thing that I desire in infinite quantity is the power of a noble culture. This is because the power of culture both makes ourselves happy and gives happiness to others.

Writings 
 "Baekbeom Ilji" (백범일지; 白凡逸志)
 "Dowae Silgi" (도왜실기; 屠倭實記)

In popular culture
 Portrayed by Kim Sang-joong and Jo Sang-geon in the 1995 KBS1 TV series Kim Gu.
 Portrayed by Lee Young-hoo in the 2010 KBS1 TV series Freedom Fighter, Lee Hoe-young.
 Portrayed by Kim Hong-pa in the 2015 film Assassination.
 Portrayed by Cho Jin-woong in the 2017 film Man of Will.

See also 
 Kim Kyu-sik
 Yoon Bong-Gil
 Lee Bong-Chang
 Kim Ja-jeom
 Kim Koo Museum

Bibliography
 Doh Jin-Soon (ed.): Kim Koo - Das Tagebuch von Baekbeom, Hamburg: Abera Verlag 2005. . German version of Baekbeomilji (Journal of Baekbeom).
 Kim, Koo (1997). Baekbeomilji [Journal of Baekbeom]. Seoul, Korea: Dolbaegae. 
 Yamabe, K. (1966). Japanese Occupation of Korea. Tokyo, Japan: Taihei Shuppan-sha.

Notes

References

External links

Kim Koo Museum & Library
Kim Koo Memorial Association

1876 births
1949 deaths
People from Haeju
Korean politicians
Korean independence activists
Korean nationalists
Assassinated Korean politicians
Assassinated South Korean people
Conservatism in South Korea
People murdered in Korea
Korean revolutionaries
South Korean anti-communists
South Korean Methodists
Converts to Protestantism from Buddhism
Korean educators
Recipients of the National Reunification Prize
Paternalistic conservatism
Anti-sadaejuui
Andong Kim clan
Korean murderers